Grass pea is a common name for several plants, and may refer to:

Lathyrus nissolia
Lathyrus sativus

References